Somjets Kesarat is a retired professional footballer from Thailand. He played for Krung Thai Bank FC in the 2008 AFC Champions League group stages.

Personal life
Somjets has a brother Tanaboon Kesarat is also a footballer and plays for Thailand national football team as a defensive midfielder.

Honours

Club
Thai Port F.C.
 Thai FA Cup winner (1) : 2009

Asian Champions League Appearances

References

External links
 https://web.archive.org/web/20110716214709/http://www.thaiportfc.com/2009/football-team/players/13-4-somjate.html

Living people
Somjets Kesarat
1980 births
Association football midfielders
Association football fullbacks
Somjets Kesarat
Somjets Kesarat